The Red Roses Stakes is a registered Victoria Racing Club Group 3  Thoroughbred horse race for three-year-old fillies, run under set weights with penalties conditions, over 1,100 metres at Flemington Racecourse, Melbourne, Australia during the VRC Spring Carnival on Crown Oaks Day.  Total prize money for the race is A$300,000.

History

Name
1983–1993 -    Red Roses Stakes 
1994–2002 - Cadbury Roses Stakes
2003  - Aquaveta Stakes
2004  - Schweppes Agrum' Stakes 
2005–2006 - Schweppervescence Stakes 
2007  - Cadbury Eden Stakes 
2008  - Cadbury Roses Stakes
2009  - TCL Electronics Stakes    
2010–2011 -  Gucci Stakes    
2012–2013 - Gucci Icons of Heritage Stakes 
2014–2015 -  Gucci Stakes  
2016 - Crown Resorts Plate 
2017–2018 - Kennedy Plate
2018 - World Horse Racing Roses Stakes
2019 - Red Roses Stakes

Grade
 1983–2013 - Listed Race
 2014 onwards - Group 3

Distance
 1983–2013 - 1200 metres
 2014 onwards - 1100 metres

Winners

 2022 - Aitch Two Oh
 2021 - Flying Evelyn
 2020 - Written Beauty
2019 - Sisstar
2018 - Bleu Roche
2017 - Jorda
2016 - Spright
2015 - Secret Agenda
2014 - Onemorezeta
2013 - Melrose Place
2012 - Shamal Wind
2011 - Emmalene 
2010 - Curtana 
2009 - Trim  
2008 - Exalted Keetah  
2007 - Gamble Me       
2006 - Gold Edition          
2005 - Crevette               
2004 - Tahni Girl                    
2003 - Danabaa               
2002 - Red Labelle                   
2001 - The Big Chill          
2000 - Wyndam Special    
1999 - Faithful Love      
1998 - Isca                 
1997 - Dantelah                
1996 - Chalee                  
1995 - Laudemio              
1994 - Princess D'Or       
1993 - Bislotto             
1992 - Gatana          
1991 - In The Bahamas  
1990 - Wrap Around     
1989 - Perfect Evening 
1988 - Blixen          
1987 - Open To Offers  
1986 - Lucky Witch     
1985 - Goodwood Lady   
1984 - Weigh           
1983 - Nouvelle Star

See also
 List of Australian Group races
 Group races

References

Horse races in Australia